Oceanne Mylène Ganiero (born 5 October 1994) is a Beninese karate champion. She won the bronze medal in individual karate under 55 kg at the 2018 African Karate Championships in Kigali, at the 2019 African Karate Championships in Gaborone, and at the 2019 African Games..

She is on the Benin national team. She received an Olympic Solidarity Scholarship to the 2020 Summer Olympics in Tokyo, Japan. In 2021, she competed at the World Olympic Qualification Tournament held in Paris, France hoping to qualify for the 2020 Summer Olympics. She was eliminated in her first match by Alexandra Recchia of France.

References 

1994 births
Beninese karateka
Living people
African Games medalists in karate
African Games bronze medalists for Benin
Competitors at the 2019 African Games